Guinea has 1,086 km of railways. This includes 279 km at  gauge and 807 km at  gauge.  The latter includes 662 km in common carrier service from Kankan to Conakry.

Currently operating in Guinea three different railway companies:

Chemin de Fer de Guinée (ONCFG),
 Chemins de Fer de la Compagnie des Bauxites de Guinée - Chemin de Fer de Conakry (CBG) and
 Chemin de Fer Boké.

The current status

The state owned railway line from Conakry to Kankan 

In June 1959, the state-owned railway company ONCFG (Office National des Chemins de Fer de Guinée) was founded. The property of the former French colonial Conakry-Niger rail authority has been transferred to it.
  
Into the following years all the rolling stock weren't maintained. Since 1993 with exception of fuel shipments to Mamou the rail traffic is suspended.

In 2008, the government of Guinea was in talks with Rio Tinto and BHP Billiton about renovation of the Conakry-Kankan line.

In 2010 the Brazilian company Vale began work on rebuilding the Conakry to Kankan railroad. As part of an agreement with the government of Guinea, Vale is investing to refurbish the railroad, which will transport passengers and general freight between capital city Conakry and Kankan in the east of the country. By rebuilding the railroad, Vale is contributing to the social and economic development of the African country, potentially creating thousands of jobs.

A major public transport development milestone was achieved in Guinea during June 2010 with the start of the Conakry Express.

Mining companies railway links 
Three railway lines are used to transport bauxite to the coast:

The route is operated by the CBG mining company. CBG transports  of bauxite and minerals annually.
The route was built in the 1960s and are in good condition.
The route is operated by the state owned mining company Societé des Bauxites de Kindia (SBK). The transport included the delivery of bauxite (annually ) from Kindia to Conakry harbour.
 Rio Tinto Limited planned to build a  railway to transport iron ore from the Simandou mine to the coast, near Matakong, for export. This line has since been taken over by a Singapore led consortium.
 Santou-Dapilon standard gauge railway  opened in 2021.

Rail links with other countries 
 There are at present no railway connections between Guinea and its neighbouring countries.

See also
 Railway stations in Guinea
 Transport in Guinea

References

External links 
 Time tables
 Interactive map of Guinean railway system